Kannivadi may refer to:

 Kannivadi, Tiruppur
 Kannivadi, Dindigul